The Gonzales County Courthouse is located in Gonzales, capital of the county of the same name in the U.S. state of Texas. It was designated a Recorded Texas Historic Landmark in 1966 and was added to the National Register of Historic Places in 1972. 

It is the second building to serve as the county courthouse. The first burned on December 3, 1893. The current three-story building, designed by J. Riely Gordon in Romanesque Revival style with eclectic details, was built with red brick and a white limestone trim.  The brick came from St. Louis, Missouri, while the limestone was cut from a nearby quarry owned by Firmin Maurin, who in 1895 was hired as superintendent for construction of the courthouse.  The contract was let on June 26, 1894, and the courthouse was completed on April 8, 1896. The structure cost $64,450. The building was extensively repaired in 1958 including receiving a new roof, and received historic restoration in 1997.

See also

National Register of Historic Places listings in Gonzales County, Texas
Recorded Texas Historic Landmarks in Gonzales County
List of county courthouses in Texas

References

External links

Buildings and structures in Gonzales County, Texas
Courthouses on the National Register of Historic Places in Texas
Government buildings completed in 1896
County courthouses in Texas
James Riely Gordon buildings
Recorded Texas Historic Landmarks
National Register of Historic Places in Gonzales County, Texas